DGDG synthase may refer to:
 Digalactosyldiacylglycerol synthase, an enzyme
 Galactolipid galactosyltransferase, an enzyme